Thomas F. Healey (1853 – February 6, 1891) was an American Major League Baseball player who pitched for one season. In he played with the Providence Grays and Indianapolis Blues.  For his career, he compiled a 6-7 record in 14 appearances, with a 2.39 earned run average and 20 strikeouts. He was born in Cranston, Rhode Island and died in Lewiston, Maine.

See also
 List of Major League Baseball annual saves leaders

References

1853 births
1891 deaths
Sportspeople from Cranston, Rhode Island
Major League Baseball pitchers
Baseball players from Rhode Island
Providence Grays players
Indianapolis Blues players
Allentown Dukes players
Utica Pent Ups players
Norfolk (minor league baseball) players
Newark Domestics players
Springfield (minor league baseball) players
New Haven (minor league baseball) players
Portland (minor league baseball) players
Haverhill (minor league baseball) players
19th-century baseball players